The Pointers is a pair of rocks off the northwest coast of Rugged Island, lying between Eddystone Rocks and Start Point, Livingston Island in the South Shetland Islands, Antarctica.

The rocks were known to 19th century sealers who named them descriptively as a navigational mark and hazard near the entrance to New Plymouth harbour.

Location

See also 
 List of Antarctic islands south of 60° S

References

External links
 The Pointers at Composite Gazetteer of Antarctica

Rock formations of the South Shetland Islands